Danger Force is an American comedy television series developed by Christopher J. Nowak that premiered on Nickelodeon on March 28, 2020. The series is a spinoff of Henry Danger and includes returning stars Cooper Barnes and Michael D. Cohen. Starring alongside them are Havan Flores, Terrence Little Gardenhigh, Dana Heath, and Luca Luhan.

Premise 
Captain Man and Schwoz recruit Chapa, Miles, Mika, and Bose, four new superheroes-in-training, to attend Swellview Academy for the Gifted.

Cast and characters 

 Cooper Barnes as Ray / Captain Man, Swellview's resident superhero who is indestructible and is training the Danger Force to be superheroes. His full name is revealed to be Raymond Esther Manchester in "Test Friends".
 Michael D. Cohen as Schwoz, an inventor who provides Captain Man and Danger Force with different inventions
 Havan Flores as Chapa, a girl who gains the ability of electrokinesis and whose superhero name is Volt. Her full name is revealed to be Lula Elena Chapa Da Silva in "Unmasked".
 Terrence Little Gardenhigh as Miles, the brother of Mika who develops the power of teleportation and whose superhero name is AWOL. His last name is revealed to be Macklin in "Mika in the Middle".
 Dana Heath as Mika, the sister of Miles who develops the ability of sonic scream and whose superhero name is ShoutOut. Her last name is revealed to be Macklin in "Mika in the Middle".
 Luca Luhan as Bose, the ditzy stepson of Vice-Mayor Willard who gains the power of telekinesis and whose superhero name is Brainstorm. His last name is revealed to be O'Brian in "Radioactive Cat".

Production 
On February 19, 2020, it was announced that a Henry Danger spinoff, Danger Force would premiere on March 28, 2020. The spinoff series sees the return of Cooper Barnes as Ray / Captain Man and Michael D. Cohen as Schwoz. The series was given an initial order of 13 episodes. In addition, Havan Flores as Chapa, Terrence Little Gardenhigh as Miles, Dana Heath as Mika, and Luca Luhan as Bose also star in the series. Based on characters created by Dan Schneider and Dana Olsen, the series was developed by Christopher J. Nowak who also serves as executive producer. Cooper Barnes and Jace Norman serve as producers for the series. Omar Camacho serves as executive producer. A quarantine episode, filmed and produced virtually, aired on May 9, 2020. On August 4, 2020, it was announced that a five-episode series of remotely produced "minisodes" would premiere on August 8, 2020. On March 18, 2021, the series was renewed for a second season of 26 episodes, which premiered on October 23, 2021. On August 25, 2022, the series was renewed for a third season.

Episodes

Reception

Ratings 
 

| link2             = List of Danger Force episodes#Season 2 (2021–22)
| episodes2         = 25
| start2            = 
| end2              = 
| startrating2      = 0.38
| endrating2        = 0.22
| viewers2          = |2}} 
}}

Awards and nominations

Notes

References

External links 
 
 

2020s American children's comedy television series
2020s Nickelodeon original programming
2020 American television series debuts
American television spin-offs
English-language television shows